The 1991 Southwest Conference men's basketball tournament was held March 8–10, 1991, at Reunion Arena in Dallas, Texas.

Number 1 seed Arkansas defeated 2 seed Texas 120–89 to win their 6th championship and receive the conference's automatic bid to the 1991 NCAA tournament.

Format and seeding
The tournament consisted of an 9 team single-elimination tournament with the 8 and 9 seeded teams play in a play-in game to decide the 8th spot.

Tournament

References

1990–91 Southwest Conference men's basketball season
Basketball in the Dallas–Fort Worth metroplex
Southwest Conference men's basketball tournament